Secondhand Lions: A New Musical is based on the 2003 movie of the same name.  Music and lyrics for the musical were written by Alan Zachary and Michael Weiner, who also wrote First Date. The book was by Rupert Holmes.

Production
The show premiered from September 6 to October 7, 2013 at The 5th Avenue Theatre in Seattle, Washington.

The show was directed by Scott Schwartz, who directed Golda's Balcony and co-directed Jane Eyre on Broadway.  Scott Schwartz was appointed Artistic Director of the Bay Street Theatre in Sag Harbor, New York in 2013.

Plot
Walter, a young boy, is unwillingly dropped off unannounced, by his mother, Mae, at his two great-uncles' farmhouse in Texas for the summer.  The uncles, Hub and Garth, recently bought the farm, returning after a long time with a secretly earned fortune.  Over the course of the summer, Walter tries to find the method in which his uncles gained money, and what they did during their absence.  The tale he hears and discovers reveals the uncles' courage and bravery in their prime.

Differences from the Film

Jane, the girl across the pond, is an added character in the musical. 
The ‘relatives’ in the film that arrive to learn about the uncle's fortune are omitted in the musical.
There are no live animals in the musical.
Jasmine, in the movie, is renamed Samira.

Musical numbers

Act 1
 Overture - Orchestra
 The Wild Lion Boys – Male Ensemble
 The Fort Worth College of Court Reporting – Mae
 Just Right – Walter
 Worth Believin’ In (Part 1)/The Steamship – Garth, Young Hub, Young Garth
 The Sultan of the Sultanate of Oujda – Fake Sultan, Ensemble
 Sand – Sultan, Harem Girls, Grand Vizier, Ensemble
 You Have to See It to Believe It – Jane, Walter
 You Have to See It to Believe It (Reprise) – Jane
 Mae's Letter – Mae
 Just What I Needed –Samira
 Unlike Anyone I’ve Ever Known – Young Hub, Sultan
 Ghita's Advice – Ghita, Samira, Harem Girls
 Hub's Revelation – Hub, Garth, Young Hub, Walter, Ensemble
Act 2
 Entracte – Orchestra
 Just What I Needed (Reprise) – Samira, Ghita, Harem Girls
 Alive or Dead – Sultan, Ensemble
 You Have Brought Me Love – Samira, Young Hub
 Fly into a Better Tomorrow – Walter, Jane, Garth, Ensemble
 The Sultan of the Sultanate of Oujda (Reprise) – Prisoners
 The Sultan's Lament – Sultan, Ensemble
 You Have Brought Me Love (Reprise) – Samira, Hub
 Worth Believin’ In (Part 2) – Hub
 The Wild Lion Boys (Reprise) – Stan
 Do Something for Me – Walter
 Don't Count Us Out – Garth, Hub, Walter
 Worth Believin’ In (Finale) - Company

Roles and original cast
The principal cast of The 5th Avenue Theatre's production was as follows.

† Grayson J. Smith appeared as Walter Double, before the song 'Just Right'.

Recordings 
The World Premiere Recording was released digitally on October 2, 2020 by Broadway Records. It includes a cut song entitled "The Fort Worth College of Court Reporting".

References

External links
 The 5th Avenue Theatre Official Website
 Zachary and Weiner Official Website
 Scott Schwartz Official Website

Musicals based on films
2013 musicals
Plays set in Texas